Crater Lake National Park is an American national park located in southern Oregon. Established in 1902, Crater Lake is the fifth-oldest national park in the United States and the only national park in Oregon. The park encompasses the caldera of Crater Lake, a remnant of Mount Mazama, a destroyed volcano, and the surrounding hills and forests.

The impressive average depth of this volcanic lake is due to the nearly symmetrical  caldera formed 7,700 years ago during the violent climactic eruptions and subsequent collapse of Mount Mazama and the relatively moist climate that is typical of the crest of the Cascade Range.

The national park encompasses . Crater Lake has no streams flowing into or out of it. All water that enters the lake is eventually lost from evaporation or subsurface seepage. The lake's water commonly has a striking blue hue, and the lake is refilled entirely from direct precipitation in the form of snow and rain.

Park purpose
As stated in the foundation document:

Geology

Volcanic activity in this area is fed by subduction off the coast of Oregon as the Juan de Fuca Plate slips below the North American Plate (see plate tectonics). Heat and compression generated by this movement has created a mountain chain topped by a series of volcanoes, which together are called the Cascade Range.  The large volcanoes in the range are called the High Cascades. However, there are many other volcanoes in the range as well, most of which are much smaller.

About 400,000 years ago, Mount Mazama began its existence in much the same way as the other mountains of the High Cascades, as overlapping shield volcanoes.

As the young stratovolcano grew, many smaller volcanoes and volcanic vents were built in the area of the park and just outside what are now the park's borders. Chief among these were cinder cones. Although the early examples are gone—cinder cones erode easily—there are at least 13 much younger cinder cones in the park, and at least another 11 or so outside its borders, that still retain their distinctive cinder cone appearance. There continues to be debate as to whether these minor volcanoes and vents were parasitic to Mazama's magma chamber and system or if they were related to background Oregon Cascade volcanism.

After a period of dormancy, Mazama became active again. Then, around 5700 BC, Mazama collapsed into itself during a tremendous volcanic eruption, losing  in height. The eruption formed a large caldera that, depending on the prevailing climate, was filled in about 740 years, forming a beautiful lake with a deep blue hue, known today as Crater Lake.

The eruptive period that decapitated Mazama also laid waste to much of the greater Crater Lake area and deposited ash as far east as the northwest corner of what is now Yellowstone National Park, as far south as central Nevada, and as far north as southern British Columbia. It produced more than 150 times as much ash as the May 18, 1980 eruption of Mount St. Helens.

This ash has since developed a soil type called andisol. Soils in Crater Lake National Park are brown, dark brown or dark grayish-brown sandy loams or loamy sands which have plentiful cobbles, gravel and stones. They are slightly to moderately acidic and their drainage is somewhat excessive.

Climate 

According to the Köppen climate classification system, Crater Lake National Park has a dry-summer subarctic climate (Dsc).

Snow is relatively rare at low elevations in western Oregon, but it is common at higher elevations, especially at Crater Lake. Winter, which typically begins at the park in September and runs through June, includes an average of 101 days with measurable snowfall.

Most of the park's roads remain closed through late spring, and snow lingers into the summer. In July and August, snowfall is uncommon, and "one magnificent day typically follows another".

Annual precipitation averages about  a year.

Although snow covers Crater Lake National Park for eight months of the year (average annual snowfall is ), the lake rarely freezes over due, in part, to a relatively mild onshore flow from the Pacific Ocean. The last recorded year in which the lake froze over was in 1949, a very long, cold winter. A 95% surface freeze occurred in 1985. The surface temperature fluctuates a bit, but the bottom temperature remains quite constant.

Fauna
Mammals that are residents of this national park are Canadian lynxes, bobcats, beavers, chipmunks, pronghorns, foxes, squirrels, porcupines, black bears, coyotes, pika, badgers, deer, elk, muskrats, and martens. Birds that commonly fly through this park including raptors are American dippers, Peregrine falcons, ravens, Clark's nutcrackers, Canada jays, bald eagles, hummingbirds and spotted owls while Canada geese float on its lake.

Park features

Some notable park features created by this huge eruption are:
 The Pumice Desert: A very thick layer of pumice and ash leading away from Mazama in a northerly direction. Even after thousands of years, this area is largely devoid of plants due to excessive porosity (meaning water drains through quickly) and poor soil composed primarily of regolith.
 The Pinnacles: When the very hot ash and pumice came to rest near the volcano, it formed  gas-charged deposits. For perhaps years afterward, hot gas moved to the surface and slowly cemented ash and pumice together in channels and escaped through fumaroles. Erosion later removed most of the surrounding loose ash and pumice, leaving tall pinnacles and spires.

Other park features
 Mount Scott is a steep andesitic cone whose lava came from magma from Mazama's magma chamber; geologists call such volcano a parasitic or satellite cone. Volcanic eruptions apparently ceased on Scott sometime before the end of the Pleistocene; one remaining large cirque on Scott's northwest side was left unmodified by post-ice-age volcanism.
 In the southwest corner of the park stands Union Peak, an extinct volcano whose primary remains consist of a large volcanic plug, which is lava that solidified in the volcano's neck.
 Crater Peak is a shield volcano primarily made of andesite and basalt lava flows topped by andesitic and dacite tephra.
 Timber Crater is a shield volcano located in the northeast corner of the park. Like Crater Peak, it is made of basaltic and andesitic lava flows but, unlike Crater, it is topped by two cinder cones.
 Rim Drive is the most popular road in the park; it follows a scenic route around the caldera rim.
 Old-growth forests covering .

History

Local Native Americans witnessed the collapse of Mount Mazama and kept the event alive in their legends. One ancient legend of the Klamath people closely parallels the geologic story which emerges from today's scientific research. The legend tells of two Chiefs, Llao of the Below World and Skell of the Above World, pitted in a battle which ended up in the destruction of Llao's home, Mt. Mazama. The battle was witnessed in the eruption of Mt. Mazama and the creation of Crater Lake.

A trio of gold prospectors—John Wesley Hillman, Henry Klippel, and Isaac Skeeters—were the first white people to visit the lake. On June 12, 1853, they stumbled upon the long, sloping mountain while hunting for provisions. Stunned by the vibrant blue color of the lake, they named the indigo body of water "Deep Blue Lake" and the place on the southwest side of the rim where he first saw the lake later became known as Discovery Point.  But gold was more on the minds of settlers at the time and the discovery was soon forgotten. The suggested name later fell out of favor by locals, who preferred the name "Crater Lake."

William Gladstone Steel devoted his life and fortune to the establishment and management of a national park at Crater Lake. His preoccupation with the lake began in 1870. In his efforts to bring recognition to the park, he participated in lake surveys that provided scientific support. He named many of the lake's landmarks, including Wizard Island, Llao Rock, and Skell Head.

With the help of geologist Clarence Dutton, Steel organized a USGS expedition to study the lake in 1886. The party carried the Cleetwood, a half-ton survey boat, up the steep slopes of the mountain then lowered it to the lake. From the stern of the Cleetwood, a piece of pipe on the end of a spool of piano wire sounded the depth of the lake at 168 different points.  Their deepest sounding, was very close to the modern official depth of  made in 2000 by sonar.  At the same time, a topographer surveyed the area and created the first professional map of the Crater Lake area.

Partly based on data from the expedition and lobbying from Steel and others, Crater Lake National Park was established May 22, 1902, by President Theodore Roosevelt. And because of Steel's involvement, Crater Lake Lodge was opened in 1915 and the Rim Drive was completed in 1918.

Highways were later built to the park to help facilitate tourism. The 1929 edition of O Ranger! described access and facilities available by then:
Crater Lake National Park is reached by train on the Southern Pacific Railroad lines into Medford and Klamath Falls, at which stops motor stages make the short trip to the park. A hotel on the rim of the lake offers accommodations. For the motorist, the visit to the park is a short side trip from the Pacific and Dalles-California highways. He will find, in addition to the hotel, campsites, stores, filling stations. The park is open to travel from late June or July 1 for as long as snow does not block the roads, generally until October.

The lake is described in the poetry of Joaquin Miller.

Activities

There are many hiking trails and several campgrounds inside the park. Unlicensed fishing is allowed without any limitation of size, species, or number. The lake is believed to have no indigenous fish, but several species of fish were introduced beginning in 1888 until all fish stocking ended in 1941. Kokanee salmon (Oncorhynchus nerka) and rainbow trout (Oncorhynchus mykiss) now thrive and reproduce here naturally.
Swimming is allowed in the lake, and the boat tours, which stop at Wizard Island, a cinder cone inside the lake, operate daily during the summer. All lake access for people is from Cleetwood Trail, a steep walking trail, and there are no roads for cars, trucks, or wagons that lead to the waterfront. All of the boats in the lake were delivered by helicopter.

Getting there requires a fairly steep  hike from the Rim Drive trailhead. On a clear day, visibility from the summit exceeds , and one can, in a single view, take in the entire caldera. Also visible from this point are the white-peaked Cascade Range volcanoes to the north, the Columbia River Plateau to the east, and the Western Cascades and the more-distant Klamath Mountains to the west.

The scenery of Crater Lake is fully accessible during the summer months. Heavy snowfalls in this park during the fall, winter, and spring months force many road and trail closures, including the popular Rim Drive, which is generally completely open from July to October and partially open in some other months, such as May, June, and November.

Trails

Cleetwood Cove 
The trail is the only one that accesses the shoreline of the lake, descending  from the Cleetwood Cove parking lot. Due to its steep grade, the trail is not accessible for mobility-impaired visitors. A dock with concessionaire boats facilitates tours around the lake with a stop at Wizard Island for dropping off and picking up passengers. Swimming and fishing are permitted. Snow may cover the trail from October to July with some variance depending on yearly snowfall conditions.

The Watchman 
It is a steady uphill trail on an isolated mountain on the west rim of the crater, with several switchbacks, providing wide views of Crater Lake and Wizard Island. Several nearby landmarks are visible from the summit, including Mount McLoughlin, Mount Thielsen, Union Peak, Mount Scott and the Klamath Basin. The trail ends next to a historic fire lookout tower built in 1932.

Lightning Spring 
The Lightning Spring trail starts from the Lightning Spring picnic area. The trail circles around several meadows up to the Lightning Spring creek. The trail is known for the frequent sight of grazing deer.

Castle Crest Wildflower Garden 
This is considered to be the easiest trail, looping around the Castle Crest Wildflower Garden. It starts from the East Rim Road, near the park's headquarters. It received its name because of a large stretch of meadows around which the trail circles and which is bursting with wildflowers in the springtime. The trail is about  before it reaches the wildflower meadow garden, from which other improvised routes depart.

Plaikni Falls 
The Plaikni Falls trail is the newest trail in the Crater Lake park. The trail leads to Plaikni Falls. Most of the trail is wheelchair-accessible. The final stretch is fairly uphill, which may prove moderately challenging.

Garfield Peak 

The Garfield Peak trail is a moderately challenging  hike to Garfield Peak. Several spots along the trail provide viewpoints overlooking the Phantom Ship island and Dutton Cliff. A few viewpoints offer unique views of Wizard island. The trail is popular in the late afternoon on account of unique shifting colors over the lake and its surroundings.

See also

 List of national parks of the United States
 High Cascades Complex Fires
 National Park Service Rustic about the architecture of the park structures
 National Register of Historic Places listings in Crater Lake National Park
 Protected areas of the United States
 Volcanic Legacy Scenic Byway

References

Works cited

Further reading

External links

 
 
 
 

 
National parks in Oregon
Civilian Conservation Corps in Oregon
Crater Lake
Parks in Klamath County, Oregon
Parks in Douglas County, Oregon
Parks in Jackson County, Oregon
Protected areas established in 1902
1902 establishments in Oregon